We Are the Fallen is an American hard rock band consisting of Irish singer and former American Idol contestant Carly Smithson, guitarist Ben Moody, guitarist John LeCompt, drummer Rocky Gray, and bassist Marty O'Brien. Moody, LeCompt, and Gray are  former members of American rock band Evanescence. The band's name alludes to Evanescence's 2003 album Fallen. Their debut album Tear the World Down was released in May 2010.

History

Formation
We Are the Fallen began forming when Moody had discussions with Evanescence drummer Rocky Gray and guitarist John LeCompt about the band moving in a different direction than originally planned. Moody said they contemplated doing music "with someone else". Moody left Evanescence in October 2003, citing "creative differences" with Amy Lee, the band's co-founder, co–songwriter, and singer. Years later, when Gray and LeCompt left the band, Moody reached out to them in attempts to continue where they had left off in 2003 with Fallen, recruiting Moody's friend Marty O'Brien in the process. The band held auditions looking for a lead singer in New York City and Moody feared that the search for the band's "soulmate" was going to take a long time due to the exhaustive process. Moody's roommate showed him videos online of Carly Smithson performing her rendition of Evanescence's "Bring Me to Life" which was coincidentally the song all singers used to audition for Moody and the band. Moody was then introduced to Smithson who was working on a solo album after the tour with American Idol.

Moody and Smithson then discussed what they wanted to do musically and they discovered their needs were "identical". Smithson felt that Idol was for a family audience which wasn't "creatively and musically the best" for her at that time. She also stated that trying to make a solo album was lonely and "now there's four other people who bring all sorts of different things to the table and musically it's like everything I was trying to do ... heavy rock with great melodies." "Everything that I was told about Carly was right. She had a great voice, but she also has an incredibly strong presence, the kind of presence that is big enough to handle what it is this band does, both musically and visually. Because of that, she was perfect", Ben Moody said later.

In 2009, Moody said that We Are the Fallen differs from Evanescence in that "everyone is equal" and that it has "more energy than Evanescence could ever muster". He also stated, "We cannot try to be who we are. If there is some similarity in sound, it's because that genre was created by us."

In 2010, Lee was asked what she thought of the formation of the band, to which she stated: "It just doesn't have anything to do with me or Evanescence. The only thing that bothers me about it, really, is I keep hearing ... 'the original members.' The only original members of Evanescence are me and Ben; John and Rocky came into the band after we'd already recorded Fallen, so there's a lot of years there...that didn't include anybody but Ben and I. Other than that, I don't have an opinion or anything to say about it."

We Are the Fallen officially debuted on June 22, 2009, with the launch of their official website. Fans could register their email address at the website to receive a free download of their first single, "Bury Me Alive". Only the first 100,000 registrants qualified for the download. The response to the free download overwhelmed their database and the song was made available via a free stream on their MySpace page while they worked to send the emails to those who qualified.

In a June 2009 interview, Moody said that, musically, We are the Fallen is going in a "completely different direction" than Evanescence, adding that in between Evanescence's music, "people might want something to listen to before then. That’s what we're here for."

The band had to confront inevitable comparisons with Evanescence. "I really do think that the farther we go, the more distinct the two [bands] will become from each other... We're so different that I really don't see it being that much of an issue", Moody told Kerrang! magazine in April 2010.

Universal Republic records (Tear the World Down)
The band originally planned to release two songs for free over the internet every two months and afterward compiling them onto a record with orchestral interludes. They planned to tour theaters across the U.S. rather than clubs or arenas to focus on "performance elements that go beyond music."

These plans changed when it was announced that We Are the Fallen signed a record deal with Universal Republic Records on October 28, 2009 for release of a full-length debut album. The band then released a remixed version of their original single, "Bury Me Alive", on February 2, 2010, to include an orchestral outro extending the song by a full minute. The song was available for purchase exclusively online at digital media outlets. On the same day, the band set up an additional free download for an acoustic version of "Bury Me Alive" at their website. The video for the song premiered on March 25, 2010, on AOL's Noisecreep website. The song's popularity grew; The Vampire Diaries used the song in previews for the television show's season finale. "Bury Me Alive" was also featured on "Rumor Has It," an episode of the television show The Hills.

We Are the Fallen performed a 28-city concert tour in the U.S. with the Finnish rock band HIM finishing in New York on May 9, 2010. Their debut concert was held at King's College in London, England in front of a 200-person crowd on March 23, 2010. Following their tour with HIM, the band headlined their own 14-city concert tour in the U.S. and Europe. The band also appeared at the Download Festival at Donington in 2010. We Are the Fallen performed at the "Cirque Des Damnés" show at the Avalon Theater in Hollywood, California on January 22, 2011. A DVD and live album from that show was slated for release later in the year.

The band's debut album, Tear the World Down, was released on May 10, 2010, in the UK and May 11, 2010, in the U.S. where it debuted and peaked at number 33 on the Billboard 200.

Ben Moody revealed in a Facebook posting that the band was dropped by Universal Republic on May 27, 2011.

In August 2010, Moody released a statement on his history with Lee, Evanescence, and We Are the Fallen, where he said, "Evanescence has progressed a great distance from the original sound and made it clear that they intended to expand much further", and that We Are the Fallen is a different entity through which he makes the music that he loves.

Post-Universal Republic Records
The band released in January 2012 a digital version of the "Cirque Des Damnés" concert performed the previous year. They also plan to release two EPs, one with all new music written by the band, and one with cover songs of '80s rock songs.

On May 20, 2012, guitarist Ben Moody uploaded a video onto his YouTube account. The video consisted of Moody and lead singer Carly Smithson explaining the future plans for the band. Ben stated that he has written enough material for one and a half new albums, and that guitarist John LeCompt and drummer Rocky Gray have also been writing music. Smithson said that she has written a "killer hit" that she has yet to preview to the rest of the band. 

In May 2021, the band was announced as a special performer for Shiprocked 2022, marking their first performance date since 2011.

On January 25, 2022, Carly Smithson revealed on an Instagram comment that Shiprocked 2022 changed their COVID-19 policy to require performers be fully vaccinated, including the additional administering of the booster dosage. She wrote; "There wasn’t enough time for everyone [in the band] to get boosted so a lot of bands couldn’t participate." In addition, she noted that We Are The Fallen would play in 2023 along with land shows prior.

Musical style
The band has been categorized as rock, hard rock, and pop metal.

Band members
 Rocky Gray – drums
 John LeCompt – rhythm guitar
 Ben Moody – lead guitar
 Marty O'Brien – bass guitar
 Carly Smithson – vocals

Discography 
Tear the World Down (2010)

Singles

References

 
American gothic metal musical groups
Musical groups established in 2009
Musical groups from Los Angeles
Musical quintets